Keith John Piper (born 18 December 1969 in Leicester) is a former professional cricketer.

A natural wicketkeeper with an eye for the spectacular, Keith Piper played for Warwickshire for 16 years. He was part of the team that won the County Championship (as part of an unprecedented treble) in 1994. In that year he made his highest first-class score of 116 not out, the innings came against Durham in the match made famous by Brian Lara scoring a first-class record 501 not out. Piper and Lara shared an unbeaten partnership of 322 which was a then county record for the fifth wicket.

Piper went on two England A Tours but never got to play a full international game. He won praise for his role in an England A tour of India and Bangladesh in 1994-5, Simon Hughes writing that Piper`s "wicketkeeping is on a par with anyone in the world".

His off the field activities brought an end to his cricket career. After serving a drugs ban in 1997, he tested positive for cannabis in the opening round of matches in 2005 and was banned for four months. His playing contract was terminated and Piper announced his retirement however he remained at the club as second XI coach until the end of the 2008 season when he took voluntary redundancy.

In 2015, he joined the coaching staff of Leicestershire.

References

External links
 Cricinfo Profile

1969 births
Living people
Warwickshire cricketers
English cricketers
Doping cases in cricket
British people of Montserratian descent
First-Class Counties Select XI cricketers
Wicket-keepers